The civil rights movement was the social and political movement in the United States between 1954 and 1968.

Civil rights movement may also refer to:

 Civil rights movement (1865–1896), the Reconstruction era and post-Reconstruction era in the United States
 Civil rights movement (1896–1954), the Jim Crow era in the United States
 Civil rights movement, the social and political movement in Northern Ireland also known as the Northern Ireland civil rights movement

See also
 
 
 Civil rights movements, social and political movements